The Brazil national youth handball team is the national under–18 handball team of Brazil. Controlled by the Brazilian Handball Confederation, that is an affiliate of the International Handball Federation IHF and also a part of the South and Central America Handball Confederation SCAHC. The team represents the country in international matches.

History

Statistics

Youth Olympic Games 

 Champions   Runners up   Third place   Fourth place

World Championship record
 Champions   Runners up   Third place   Fourth place

Youth South and Central American Championship record
 Champions   Runners up   Third place   Fourth place

Squad

Notable players

References

External links
World Men's Youth Championship table
European Men's Youth Championship table

Handball in Brazil
Men's national youth handball teams
Handball